The In Crowd is a live album by the Ramsey Lewis Trio, recorded in 1965 at the Bohemian Caverns nightclub in Washington, D.C., and released on the Argo label.

Reception

The album provided Lewis with his biggest hit, reaching the top position on the Billboard R&B Chart and No. 2 on their top 200 albums chart in 1965, and the title track single "The 'In' Crowd" reached No. 2 on the R&B Chart and No. 5 on the Hot 100 singles chart in the same year. The album also received a Grammy Award in 1966 for Best Instrumental Jazz Performance by an Individual or Group, and the title track single was inducted into the Grammy Hall of Fame in 2009.

AllMusic stated that "this is the moment where Lewis shined the brightest, the 'in crowd' at the club was verbally into it, and the time for this music was right".

Track listing
 "The 'In' Crowd" (Billy Page) - 5:50    
 "Since I Fell for You" (Buddy Johnson) - 4:06    
 "Tennessee Waltz" (Pee Wee King, Redd Stewart) - 5:02    
 "You Been Talkin' 'Bout Me Baby" (Gale Garnett, Ray Rivers) - 3:01    
 "Spartacus (Love Theme from)" (Alex North) - 7:17    
 "Felicidade (Happiness)" (Antônio Carlos Jobim, Vinicius de Moraes) - 3:29    
 "Come Sunday" (Duke Ellington) - 4:50

Personnel 
Ramsey Lewis – piano
Eldee Young – bass, cello
Redd Holt – drums

See also
List of number-one R&B albums of 1965 (U.S.)

References 

1965 live albums
Ramsey Lewis live albums
Argo Records live albums
Albums produced by Esmond Edwards
Grammy Award for Best Jazz Instrumental Album